is an interchange railway station in Jōetsu, Niigata, Japan, operated by East Japan Railway Company (JR East), West Japan Railway Company (JR West) and the third-sector railway operator Echigo Tokimeki Railway. It opened in March 2015.

Lines
Jōetsumyōkō Station is served by the Echigo Tokimeki Railway Myōkō Haneuma Line and the high-speed Hokuriku Shinkansen, which opened for service on 14 March 2015. It replaced Wakinoda Station on the Shinetsu Main Line, located approximately 120 m away. The journey from Tokyo via the Hokuriku Shinkansen takes 1 hour 48 minutes. Only Hakutaka semi-fast Tokyo-to-Kanazawa services stop at Jōetsumyōkō on the Hokuriku Shinkansen.

Station layout
The new station consists of two elevated island platforms serving four tracks on the Hokuriku Shinkansen, with a ground-level island platform serving two tracks for the Myōkō Haneuma Line. The station has a "Midori no Madoguchi" staffed ticket office and also a "View Plaza" travel agent.

Platforms

History

Initially provisionally named , the name Jōetsumyōkō Station was formally announced in June 2013. Construction was completed in October 2014. It opened on 14 March 2015, coinciding with the opening of the Hokuriku Shinkansen extension from Nagano.

Passenger statistics
In fiscal 2017, the Myōkō Hanauma Line portion of the station was used by an average of 934 passengers daily (boarding passengers only). In fiscal 2017, the JR portion of the station was used by an average of 2,131 passengers daily (boarding passengers only).

Surrounding area
The station is located on the southern side of the Takada district of Jōetsu city, about 1.5 km from the border with Myōkō. The area was largely rice paddies with some houses, shops and factories along nearby Japan National Route 18; however, with the opening of the Shinkansen line, the area is rapidly urbanising.

See also
 List of railway stations in Japan

References

External links

 JR East station information 
 Echigo Tokimeki Railway Station information 
 Timetable for Joetsumyoko Station 

Stations of East Japan Railway Company
Railway stations in Niigata Prefecture
Railway stations in Japan opened in 2015
Jōetsu, Niigata